

Television

Notes
Due to the 2008 Atlanta tornado outbreak, ESPN2, instead of CBS, aired the 2008 SEC tournament finals from Alexander Memorial Coliseum on the campus of Georgia Tech. However, CBS production was utilized including talent and graphics.

Radio

References

Sec
CBS Sports
ABC Sports
Basketball on NBC
ESPN2
Finals broadcasters
CBS Radio Sports